Ahmed Salah (born June 18, 1982 in Iraq) is a former Iraqi footballer who is currently the assistant coach of Al-Shorta.

Career
Ahmed Salah started playing in the Baghdad district of Al-Dora and his school team before moving the Al-Omal youth team where he spent six years. A move to Al-Zawraa quickly followed before he was called up into the Iraqi Under-17s – helping the team to the AFC U-17 Championship 1998 where he scored four goals in four games in Doha, Qatar. He was called into the Iraqi Under-19s by Thair Jassim and helped the team to qualify to the AFC Youth Championship 2000 in Tehran, Iran scoring in the 6-0 win over the Maldives in Rajshahi, Bangladesh. The starlet was one of three players left out on standby along with Alaa Sattar and Luay Salah for the finals in Tehran.

In September 2000, Salah was called up to the Iraq B team in an International Tournament held in Indonesia, helping the team to runners-up spot behind a full-strength Indonesian national team.

In 2000 Salah decided to join Al-Talaba along with fellow Al-Zawraa team-mates Khalid Mohammed Sabbar and Husham Ali. At the club, Ahmed was given more opportunities in the first team then at Al-Zawraa and clearly repaid the confidence the club showed in him with his match winning performances, helping the team to the league and cup double in 2002.

Salah made his debut for Iraq at the end 2002, and has been a regular in Adnan Hamad's Olympic squad. He was part of Iraq Olympic team in the 2004 Summer Olympic Games which finished 4th.

In The Arab Champions League 2003-2004 Ahmad Salah scored 6 goals and helped Al-Talaba to reach the 3rd stage, Al-Talaba was 1 point behind qualifying to the semi-finals.

He signed a deal to play for Egyptian giants Al-Zamalek with team-mate Salih Sadir but his career in Egypt wasn't successful, he moved to Qatar and played with Al-Shamal few matches and scored 2 goals, played with the Syrian team Al-Ittihad and also scored 2 goals, but he did not success with the teams he played outside Iraq.

After the unsuccessful seasons outside Iraq, Ahmad Salah signed with Erbil and he assisted his team to win Iraq Super League and he won the Iraq Super League Top scorers award with 11 goals.

In December 2007, Erbil played in the 2007 King's Cup as Iraq B team and Salah was one of Erbil's main strikers, he scored the opening goal of the 3-1 victory over Uzbekistan and he helped the team to reach the King's Cup final, and they became runner-up after lose to Thailand 0-1.

Alwan had a successful four years in Erbil forming a striking partnership with Luay Salah to lead them to three championships at his time at the club. On 16 September he was released along with 7 other players by Erbil SC.

Managerial statistics

International goals
Scores and results list Iraq's goal tally first.

Honours

Country 
 4th place in 2004 Athens Olympics
 2005 West Asian Games Gold medallist.

Club
Iraqi Premier League
Winner:6
 1999 with Al-Zawra'a SC
 2000 with Al-Zawra'a SC
 2002 with Talaba SC
 2006/2007 with Erbil SC2007/2008 with Erbil 
 2008/2009 with Erbil SC
Iraq FA Cup
Winner:4
 1999 with Al-Zawra'a SC 
 2000 with Al-Zawra'a SC
 2002 with Talaba SC
 2003 with Talaba SC
Damascus International Championship
Winner:1
 2005 with Talaba SC
Syrian Premier League
Winner 1 
 2005/2006 with Al-Ittihad SC Aleppo
Syrian Cup
Winner 2 
2005 with Al-Ittihad SC Aleppo
 2006 with Al-Ittihad SC Aleppo

Individual
2002 Iraqi Elite Cup Player of the Tournament
2003 Iraqi Elite Cup Player of the Tournament

External links

References

1982 births
Iraqi footballers
Iraq international footballers
Living people
Iraqi expatriate footballers
Expatriate footballers in Syria
Al-Ittihad Aleppo players
Olympic footballers of Iraq
2004 AFC Asian Cup players
Footballers at the 2004 Summer Olympics
Al-Zawraa SC players
Al-Shamal SC players
duhok SC players
Al-Shorta SC managers
Association football forwards
Syrian Premier League players
Iraqi football managers